Presidential elections were held in Lithuania on 11 May 2014, with a second round held on 25 May between the top two candidates from the first round. In the second round, incumbent President Dalia Grybauskaitė was re-elected with 58% of the vote.

Electoral changes
Since these elections all potential voters, living permanently or temporarily outside of Republic of Lithuania, had to submit documents to Central Election Commission's register.

Participating candidates
Initially 12 candidates were officially confirmed to participate, but only 7 fulfilled the criterion of 20,000 supporting signatures.
 Zigmantas Balčytis (Social Democratic Party), Member of the European Parliament
 Dalia Grybauskaitė, incumbent President of Lithuania (2009–2014)
 Artūras Paulauskas (Labour Party), member of Seimas
 Naglis Puteikis, member of Seimas
 Bronis Ropė (Lithuanian Peasant and Greens Union), Mayor of Ignalina
 Valdemar Tomaševski, Member of the European Parliament
 Artūras Zuokas (YES), Mayor of Vilnius

Grybauskaitė was supported by the Homeland Union and Liberal Movement.

Unsuccessful candidates include: Rolandas Paksas, Linas Balsys, Kristina Brazauskienė, Vladas Lašas, Jonas Lašinis, Rolandas Paulauskas.

Opinion polls

Results

References

External links
2014 Lithuanian presidential elections VRK 

Lithuania
Presidential
Presidential elections in Lithuania